Mladen Veselinović (born 22 May 1992) is a Serbian football defender who plays for Budućnost Dobanovci in the Serbian First League.

Club career
He has been a player of FK Hajduk Kula from 2010 to 2013, but he was loaned out to lower ranked clubs at the beginning of his career. He didn't get a real chance until 2012. After the dissolution of the Hajduk in summer 2013, he joined the FK Napredak Kruševac together with his teammate Miloš Cvetković.

During the winter break of the 2013–14 season, he left Napredak and joined another SuperLiga club, FK Donji Srem.

References

External links
 
 
 Stats at Utakmica.rs

1992 births
Living people
Sportspeople from Knin
Serbs of Croatia
People from the Republic of Serbian Krajina
Serbian footballers
Association football defenders
FK Hajduk Kula players
FK Mladost Apatin players
FK TSC Bačka Topola players
FK Napredak Kruševac players
FK Donji Srem players
FK Sloga Petrovac na Mlavi players
OFK Bačka players
FK Budućnost Dobanovci players
Serbian SuperLiga players
Serbian First League players